Sarqanat (also Romanized as Sarqanāt) is a village in Vahdatiyeh Rural District of Sadabad District, Dashtestan County, Bushehr province, Iran. At the 2006 census, its population was 907 in 205 households. The following census in 2011 counted 994 people in 250 households. The latest census in 2016 showed a population of 1,052 people in 281 households; it was the largest village in its rural district.

References 

Populated places in Dashtestan County